The 1995 LPGA Tour was the 46th season since the LPGA Tour officially began in 1950. The season ran from January 12 to November 5. The season consisted of 33 official money events. Annika Sörenstam won the most tournaments, three. She also led the money list with earnings of $666,533.

The season saw the first tournament in South Korea, the Samsung World Championship of Women's Golf. There were 12 first-time winners in 1995: Nanci Bowen, Gail Graham, Becky Iverson, Tracy Kerdyk, Julie Larsen, Jenny Lidback, Kathryn Marshall, Michelle McGann, Alison Nicholas, Annika Sörenstam, Barb Thomas, and Karrie Webb. Sörenstam went on to win 72 LPGA events in her career, the third most all-time.

The tournament results and award winners are listed below.

Tournament results
The following table shows all the official money events for the 1995 season. "Date" is the ending date of the tournament. The numbers in parentheses after the winners' names are the number of wins they had on the tour up to and including that event. Majors are shown in bold.

* – non-member at time of win

Awards

References

External links
LPGA Tour official site
1995 season coverage at golfobserver.com

LPGA Tour seasons
LPGA Tour